Design Orchard is a two and a half storey integrated retail and incubation space located on Orchard Road, Singapore.

Design

Design Orchard was developed by JTC Corporation and designed by WOHA. One of the most prominent features is a terraced public rooftop.

The building is built from a minimal material palette of Béton brut concrete, glass, timber and plants. One interesting feature of the structure are the porthole windows, which allow light, views, and ventilation through the raw concrete walls.

Facilities

Retail space

The ground floor retail space was spearheaded by the Singapore Tourism Board, operated by Naiise, and houses 61 Singaporean brands. Brands include Plain Vanilla Bakery, fragrance label Oo La Lab, clothing brand Yacht 21, handbag line Ling Wu, The Animal Project, and Jewels Rock Sugar Sticks.

Incubation spaces

At level 2 & 3, co-working spaces known as 'The Cocoon Space' is spearheaded by Enterprise Singapore and operated by the Textile and Fashion Federation of Singapore serve to incubate emerging design talent.

Public space

The rooftop of the building is open to the public and is sloped to create an amphitheatre and includes ample green spaces.

References

External links
 The Making of Design Orchard (video)
 WOHA's Singapore Design Orchard Nears Completion
 Design Orchard: A Breath Of Fresh Air On Orchard Road By WOHA
 Design Orchard Has Over 60 Local Brands & A Rooftop Garden For You To Dodge The Crowds
 Design Orchard: The new shopping hotspot that showcases more than 60 local labels for fashion, beauty, and homeware

2019 establishments in Singapore
Orchard Road
Orchard, Singapore
WOHA
Architecture in Singapore